The I.E. Max Ludwig Planck (commonly known as Colegio Max Planck) is a private German university preparatory school for boys in Trujillo, northern Peru. It primarily teaches freshman and sophomore college subjects, and is commonly known for the high level of education it offers.

Max Planck Group
This school is part of the homonym educational group which includes the Max Ludwig Planck School, Jose María Escrivá School, Max Kids Nursery and Max Planck College Preparation Institute (also in Cajamarca and Chiclayo).

History
Víctor Castro Vidal formed the College Preparation Institute Max Planck in 1993, and then had the idea of creating a pre-university school. With the support of professionals and friends, as well as the motivation of his wife, Elsa Ms. Salinas, he started to look for the appropriate resolution. The school opened in March 2003 and initiated educational activities. There are over 400 students and the current director is Mr. Luis Guzman Perez.

The Federal Republic of Germany gave an affiliation called PASH (Schools Partners for the Future), making it possible for students to travel to that country to acquire new knowledge, cultural exchange and improve the German language taught in school.

External links
 Official website 

Private schools in Peru
Buildings and structures in Trujillo, Peru
1993 establishments in Peru